Veger is a surname. Notable people with the surname include:

Filip Veger (born 1994), Croatian tennis player and coach
Marija Veger (born 1947), Serbian basketball player